In archaeological cultures of North America, the classic stage is the theoretical North and Meso-American societies that existed between AD 500 and 1200. This stage is the fourth of five stages posited by Gordon Willey and Philip Phillips' 1958 book Method and Theory in American Archaeology.

Cultures of the Classic Stage are supposed to possess craft specialization and the beginnings of metallurgy. Social organization is supposed to involve the beginnings of urbanism and large ceremonial centers. Ideologically, Classic cultures should have a developed theocracy.

The "Classic Stage" was initially defined as restricted to the complex societies of Mesoamerica and Peru. However, the time period includes other advanced cultures, such as  Hopewell, Teotihuacan, and the early Maya.

The "Classic Stage" followed the Formative stage (Pre-Classic) and was superseded by the Post-Classic stage. There are alternative classification systems, and this ranking would overlap what others classify as the Woodland period and Mississippian cultures.

 The Lithic stage
 The Archaic stage
 The Formative stage
 The Classic stage 
 The Post-Classic stage

See also
Archaeology of the Americas
:Category:Archaeology of the Americas
Chachapoyas culture
Cultural periods of Peru
Mesoamerican chronology
Olmec influences on Mesoamerican cultures

References

External links

 
500s establishments
1200s disestablishments
1958 introductions
1950s neologisms
+4
+4
+4